Ho Su-lung (born 9 September 1940) is a Taiwanese boxer. He competed in the men's lightweight event at the 1968 Summer Olympics.

References

1940 births
Living people
Taiwanese male boxers
Olympic boxers of Taiwan
Boxers at the 1968 Summer Olympics
Sportspeople from Taipei
Lightweight boxers
20th-century Taiwanese people